Francis E. Gleeson, Jr. (November 25, 1937 – February 17, 2015) was a Democratic member of the Pennsylvania House of Representatives.

References

Democratic Party members of the Pennsylvania House of Representatives
2015 deaths
1937 births